Dakota North is a fictional character that has appeared in various comic book series published by Marvel Comics. Originally the star of her own short-lived series and later a part of the supporting casts of Cage (1992), Daredevil (1998), and Captain Marvel (2012), the character exists in Marvel's main shared universe, known as the Marvel Universe.

Publication history
Dakota North first appeared in her own bi-monthly series, Dakota North #1–5 (June 1986 – February 1987). She was created by writer Martha Thomases and artist Tony Salmons, neither of whom had much experience with regular comics series. The series was canceled after five issues, although the explanations for the cancellation are murky.

The character subsequently appears in Web of Spider-Man (1985) #37, Power Pack (1984) #46, Marvel Super-Heroes vol. 2 (1990) #3, Cage (1992) #1–4, 6, 8, 10, 15, 19–20, Black Panther vol. 3 (1998) #31–33, The New Avengers (2005) #29, Daredevil vol. 2 (1998) #82–86, 87–88, 92–94, 97, 99, 101–102, 105–115, 117–119, 500–504, 508–512, Daredevil vol. 2 Annual (2007) #1, Captain Marvel vol. 7 (2012) #11, 13–14, Avengers Assemble vol. 2 (2012) #17, and Daredevil vol. 3 (2011) #30.Dakota North received an entry in The Official Handbook of the Marvel Universe Update '89 #5 (1989), Marvel Legacy: The 1980s Handbook #1 (2006), and The Official Handbook of the Marvel Universe A-Z #8 (2009). She was also listed in the Punisher section of the appendix in Marvel Encyclopedia: Marvel Knights (2004).

A new Dakota North series written by C. B. Cebulski and penciled by Lauren McCubbin was purported to be published in 2006. A promo image by McCubbin was released, but the series never materialized.

Fictional character biography
Dakota North is the daughter of ex-CIA agent Samuel James "S.J." North and his wife Caroline. Dakota North  and her newborn brother Ricky were raised by their father after their mother died in an apparently accidental car explosion; however, SJ frequently hired others to watch the children when his agency work called him away. After a successful child modeling stint, during which she appeared on several magazine covers, Dakota decided at a young age to become a private detective. SJ disapproved, wanting her to pursue a safer career, but the headstrong Dakota chose her own path, causing ongoing discord between them. After serving a three-year apprenticeship with Holt Investigations and its successor, she opened her own agency specializing in high-paying fashion industry cases, using her model connections to her advantage. She funneled an early finder's fee into the company and soon owned small branches in New York, Rome, Tokyo and Paris. Though Dakota owned the agencies, Robert "Mad Dog" Morales ran the New York branch (headquartered in a lower Manhattan townhouse). Yvon Berse ran the Paris branch, and other unidentified executives looked after the rest.

Business executive Cleo Vanderlip, an old rival of SJ North from decades earlier, sought to crash the stock value of her employer, the high-tech corporation Rycom, so she could take it over. She arranged for them to purchase and heavily invest in Luke Jacobson Fashion, planning to ruin the company by killing fashion mogul Luke Jacobson. Making herself Merchandising vice president, she blackmailed Luke's love-struck sssistant Anna Stasio into assisting her. Wanting to destroy SJ by slaying Dakota too, Cleo had thug Scott "Otto" Shanks vandalize Jacobson's workplace, then suggested that Luke hire Dakota for protection. Vanderlip then instructed Shanks to kill both, but North saved Jacobson, killing Shanks in the process.

Dakota's then 12-year-old brother Ricky came to stay with her and promptly became involved in  case when their father's old friend Major George C. "Coop" Cooper left a nerve-gas-filled pen with the boy. Seeking the gas, Vanderlip assigned desperate young model Daisy Kane to befriend Ricky. Unknown to Dakota, the pair traveled to Europe while she protected Coop from Russian thugs hunting down the nerve gas. Dakota trailed Ricky to Paris, where she evaded a Vanderlip-sponsored assassination attempt in the Musée National d'Art Moderne, housed in the Centre Georges Pompidou, and then lost him when he took a train for Venice but disembarked in Switzerland. Aided by police detective Amos Culhane, who had a shameless crush on Dakota and frequently tried to win her affections, Dakota reunited with Ricky outside Grindelwald, Switzerland, but the trio was captured by Sheik Ibn Bheik, an ally of Vanderlip's who used his private soldiers and his trained falcon to hold Dakota and her allies captive. They eventually escaped and the nerve gas was released in the sheik's castle, killing all present.

Dakota was later hired to investigate the "Slasher," a serial killer who targeted fashion models, slashing their faces and cutting their throats. The case was complicated by Harvey Finklestein, who sought to prove himself a hero and win over model Elyse Nolan by protecting her from a hired fake "Slasher." Despite the diversion, Dakota exposed a deranged Elyse as the real Slasher and captured her with Spider-Man's assistance before Elyse could claim her next intended victim, Mary Jane Watson.

When young Jack Power showed up on Dakota's office doorstep wanting to clear the name of his favorite author, Jessie Wilcox Jones, Dakota took the case for fun. Jones had been accused of creating a fake national treasure hunt, but her former employee Jerome Horwitz had stolen the money. Dakota quickly deduced the truth, cooperating with the Punisher in the process, but was unable to prove anything. Eventually Horwitz confessed, apparently of his own accord but actually frightened into it by Jack Power and his sister Katie, both (unknown to Dakota) members of the child super-hero group Power Pack.

While out shopping, Dakota witnessed the Wasp battling the shape-changing Kingsize; when Kingsize, in snake form, caught the heroine in his jaws, Dakota shot him, freeing the Wasp, who then defeated Kingsize. Kingsize had claimed to be an Inhuman giant so, assuming that turned out to be true, Wasp called the Fantastic Four for help returning him to his people and keeping him out of the Vault.

The Chicago Spectator newspaper hired Dakota's company to provide a full background on super-mercenary Luke Cage, the former Power Man, whom the paper wanted to feature for sales purposes. During her investigation, Dakota learned that Cage's father, James Lucas, still lived, though Cage believed him dead. Dakota did not add this information to Cage's paper file, fearing villains could use it against the hero if they learned of it. After briefing the paper's affiliates including Analisa Medina, Jeryn Hogarth, Mickey Hamilton, and Mr. Drewston, Dakota met Cage, who agreed to work for the paper on specific cases. Dakota briefed Cage on his first assignment, criminal businessman Elio Angelopoulos III, and she was later hired to run the paper's security.

When the assassin and enforcer Hardcore stole Cage's file from Dakota's office, she was relieved she had kept Lucas' information out of the file, unaware that Hardcore had bugged her office and heard her speak about it. Hardcore later sent the Untouchables (Kickback, Nitro, and Tombstone) after Dakota; when a guard was killed in the battle, Dakota felt responsible. She asked Cage to help her take them down, but he refused due to lack of cash, so she called in the Punisher. Learning the criminals were seeking information on his father, Cage angrily confronted Dakota, but backed off when she threatened to shoot him in the crotch. After promising Cage the information if he aided her against the Untouchables, Dakota was kidnapped by Kickback, who delivered her to Hardcore. After she was Tasered while trying to escape, Kickback, having developed feelings for Dakota, tried freeing her, but Hardcore stopped him, then interrogated her about Cage's father. Cage and Punisher rescued Dakota, but Kickback was killed while the other villains escaped.

When Cage later went missing, Dakota initiated a search for his father in New York, killing an assassin sent after her. She finally tracked James Lucas to Arizona, but Cage had been kidnapped by Hardcore and Cruz Bushmaster. Dakota joined forces with Mickey and Iron Fist to save him. Dakota continued to help Cage find his father and they followed a lead by the Tinkerer that led them into battle with the Assassin Nation. Dakota and Cage aided Tinkerer's son Agent, against them and ultimately saved Cage's father. Shortly after this, Dakota did research for Cage when he was hired to retrieve a mystic item. She ended up on the receiving end of a beating by Cage when he was possessed by Bogeyman, but ultimately helped Cage resist the Bogeyman's control. Dakota was the only one aware that Cage survived when driving out the Bogeyman for good and helped Cage stay undercover as long as the authorities were after him.

Months later, the Black Panther's cousin, M'Koni, hired Dakota to investigate her husband, Wheeler, who proved to be in the drug-induced thrall of the insane and deadly Wakandan Malice (Nakia). Black Panther hired Dakota to watch his love, Monica Lynne, who was Malice's next target. Malice sent several drug-controlled men after Monica, but Dakota protected her and returned her to the Wakandan Consulate, where Malice nearly killed Dakota with a garrote before Black Panther saved her.

Later, when blind attorney Matt Murdock was imprisoned on suspicion of being Daredevil, his law partners Franklin "Foggy" Nelson and Becky Blake hired Dakota at the recommendation of Jessica Jones to provide security and do investigative work for the firm. While visiting Murdock with Foggy, the pair were ambushed; restrained during the attack, Dakota watched in horror as Foggy was stabbed repeatedly and seeming died en route to the hospital. Dakota began working with reporter Ben Urich to track down those behind the attack and used her contacts to learn a new Daredevil was on the streets, later learning it was Iron Fist (Danny Rand), who had been duped by corrupt attorney Alton Lennox in a complex plot against Murdock. Murdock soon escaped from jail, and with Dakota's help he tracked Lennox to Europe where the plot's mastermind, Vanessa Fisk, was exposed. Murdock returned to New York, the charges against him  dropped, and Foggy's "death" was revealed to have been faked to place him in Witness Protection. In time, Murdock confided in Dakota that he truly was Daredevil, and she began aiding him regularly through several crises, including tracing the sudden insanity of Murdock's wife, Milla Donovan, to Daredevil's mind-altering foe Mr. Fear (Larry Cranston). At Murdock's request, Dakota reluctantly worked with parolee Carlos LaMuerto, the former Black Tarantula, but LaMuerto soon quit. Murdock grew more irritable and desperate when Milla was put into a mental institution after being released from jail, but Dakota continued working for Matt, putting him in his place when necessary. Dakota drove Murdock to visit Milla over the following weeks, and took him out for a drink when he learned he was not allowed to see Milla while she received treatment.

Luke Cage sought Murdock's help in clearing "Big" Ben Donovan of a false murder charge. Dakota began investigating the case, convincing Murdock to join her and fight his depression. When Dakota got close to the truth, she was assaulted by a man she later identified as FBI agent Moss. After she attacked Moss with a baseball bat, daring him to come after her again, she was shocked to see her estranged father at her apartment, warning her off the case. More determined than ever, Dakota learned Donovan had a son who had been threatened, but Moss shot her before she could report to Murdock. Dakota was rushed into surgery while Matt cleared up the case with SJ's help, exposing mobster Eric Slaughter for the set-up, exonerating Donovan, and seeing Moss arrested. After having Iron Fist accelerate her healing, Murdock trained with Dakota back at his townhouse, leading to a brief romantic tryst, which Murdock almost immediately regretted as he considered it a betrayal of his wife. Dakota tried staying professional, but an unidentified investigator had photographed the affair for Milla's parents, who were fighting for legal custody of Milla. Ashamed of the damage she had inadvertently caused, Dakota subsequently avoided Murdock.

Dakota was later stripped of her private investigator's license as part of the Kingpin's plot to frame the H.A.M.M.E.R. director Norman Osborn for going after Daredevil's friends to manipulate Matt Murdock to take further action against Osborn as well as further criminalizing his actions with The Hand. Using a compromising photograph, Dakota and Foggy forced the judge who had both of their professional licenses revoked to learn the Kingpin was behind their recent problems, leading her to decide that they need to locate Murdock at once.

Some time later, Carol Danvers developed a brain lesion that worsened every time she used her powers to fly. To help her remain healthy and mobile, her friend Wendy Kawasaki modified one of Captain America's old Sky-Cycles and Carol hired Dakota to teach her how to fly it. Dakota additionally helped Carol track down the new Deathbird and, along with her other friends and the Avengers, supported Carol in her pursuit to identify and beat her enemy Yon-Rogg (going by the new name Magnitron).

Powers and abilities
An above average athlete, Dakota North is skilled in several forms of hand-to-hand combat, and is an excellent markswoman. She speaks passable French, Japanese and Italian, and is familiar with other, unspecified, languages. She is also proficient in driving high-end cars and motorcycles.

Supporting characters
 Hugo "Guy" Beaumontain - Friend of Dakota North's father, S.J., Guy was part of the resistance and they fought the Germans together. 
 Yvon Berse - Managed the Paris office of Dakota North Investigations. 
 Sheik Ibn Bheik – Has a falcon named Brutus. 
 Maj. George C. Cooper - A friend of Samuel James North.
 Detective Amos Culhane – Has a cat named Furillo.  
 Diana Glenn - 
 Studs Grey – 
 Luke Jacobson - A fashion mogul who Dakota North once protected after he received death threats.
 Jean - 
 Daisy Kane - 
 Kirsch - 
 Ricky North - Dakota North's brother
 Samuel James "S.J." North - Dakota North's father
 Robert "Mad Dog" Morales 
 Pettishford - 
 Otto Shanks - 
 Anna Stasio - 
 Timas - 
 Cleo Vanderlip -

Collected editions
A trade paperback collecting early Dakota North material was released on June 26, 2018.

Further reading
 The Spectacular Sisterhood of Superwomen: Awesome Female Characters from Comic Book History'' by Hope Nicholson, Quirk Books (2017)

References

External links
Dakota North at Marvel.com

1986 comics debuts
Comics characters introduced in 1986
Fictional models
Fictional private investigators
Marvel Comics female superheroes
Marvel Comics martial artists
Marvel Comics titles
Daredevil (Marvel Comics)